Abdul Sattar Edhi Hockey Stadium, known until 2016 as the Hockey Club of Pakistan, is a field hockey stadium located in Karachi, Sindh, Pakistan.

History 
The stadium was constructed in 1963 under the administration of Karachi Cantonment Board. It was leased to Pakistan Hockey Federation for a period of 30 years, which ended in 1993. The lease was renewed for another 30 years, till 2023. However, the structure has been declared as dangerous by the Karachi Cantonment Board and Sindh Building Control Authority.

In July 2022, plans were announced to renovate the stadium by the Pakistan Hockey Federation and the Government of Sindh. Frontier Works Organization has been contracted to conduct the work at a budget of Rs. 1.5 billion. The project is stated to include the installation of seats, indoor gyms, swimming pools, boys' hostel, and changing rooms.

Tournaments hosted
The stadium has hosted matches of the 1980, 1981, 1983, 1984, 1986, and 1992 editions of the Champions Trophy. The stadium has a capacity of 30,000 people. However, the International Hockey Federation stripped it of its international status in 2008 since it no longer had a practice pitch and a parking lot. Two editions of National Games of Pakistan have taken place here.

References 

Field hockey venues in Pakistan
Sports venues in Karachi
Stadiums in Karachi